Dmytro Ihorovych Piddubnyi (born 15 January 2000) is a Ukrainian professional football midfielder who plays for Metalurh Zaporizhzhia in the Ukrainian Second League.

Career 
Piddubnyi is a product of the UOR Simferopol, DVUFK Dnipropetrovsk and Zorya Luhansk Youth Sportive Sportive Systems. 

He played for FC Zorya in the Ukrainian Premier League Reserves and in March 2020 Piddubnyi was promoted to the senior squad team. He made his debut in the Ukrainian Premier League for Zorya Luhansk on 22 August 2020, played as a substituted second-half player in a losing away match against FC Desna Chernihiv.

References

External links 
Statistics at UAF website (Ukr)
 

2000 births
Living people
Ukrainian footballers
FC Zorya Luhansk players
FC VPK-Ahro Shevchenkivka players
FC Metalurh Zaporizhzhia players
Ukrainian Premier League players
Ukrainian First League players
Ukrainian Second League players
Association football midfielders